The Ground Force of Mongolia (Mongol Ulsyn Zevsegt hüchniy Huurai zamyn tsereg) is the land force of the Mongolian Armed Forces, formed from parts of the former Mongolian People's Army in 1992. It was known as the "Mongolian General Purpose Force" until 2016.

History

At present Mongolia's armed forces have become more compact and professional since obligatory military service was replaced with the alternative between military and other service. The ground force, a core of the armed forces, are the main force to defend the country by military means. In peacetime, the ground force direct their activities toward ensuring the mobilization readiness of the Mongolian Armed Forces, providing military training for the population, forming personnel resources, and organizing the maintenance, protection and servicing of military equipment and material reserves. Depending on the organizational specifics of military units and organizations, the ground force are divided into combat, on-combat-duty, training, training combat, and stockpile and service units.

As a result of reform processes started in 1997, units of the Mongolian Armed Forces were reorganized into a brigade-battalion system. In peacetime, sub-units of brigades have a mixed personnel organization (i.e. of constant combat readiness, training, and under strength). In 2016, the General Purpose Force was renamed to its current name of Ground Force of the Armed Forces. In 1997 the Mongolian Armed Forces had in service 650 tanks, 120 light armored reconnaissance vehicles, 400 armored infantry fighting vehicles, 300 armored personnel carriers, 300 towed artillery, 130 multiple rocket launchers, 140 mortars, and 200 anti-tank guns. Mongolia deployed its troops to peacekeeping operations in Iraq and Afghanistan with 1970s Soviet-bloc weapons, transportation, and equipment. Although Mongolian troops are highly skilled with using these weapons and equipment, they are not interoperable with the rest of the coalition members. Except for the United States-provided Harris Corporation communications equipment, Mongolia had no other equipment which was interoperable. From January 14 to 18 in 2008, Chief of the General Staff of the MAF Lieutenant General Tsevegsuren Togoo signed an agreement for acquisition of equipment and vehicles from Russia for 120 million US dollars during his official visit to Moscow.

Structure

Peacekeeping missions

Mongolian armed forces are performing peacekeeping missions in South Sudan, Sierra Leone, Ethiopia, Congo, Eritrea, Western Sahara, and Afghanistan, and with the United Nations Mission in Liberia. In 2005 and 2006, Mongolian troops also served as part of the Belgian KFOR contingent in Kosovo. From 2009 the Mongolian Armed Forces deploying its largest peace keeping mission to Chad and the government is planning to deploy its first fully self-sufficient UN mission there in mid-2011.

Equipment

Gallery

References

''World aircraft information files Bright Star Publishing London File 332 Sheet 3

External links

General Staff of the Mongolian Armed Forces 
Ministry of Defense 
General Intelligence Agency
Photographic report on the Military Parade for the honor of National Flag of Mongolia, 2011

 
Military units and formations established in 1992